Oh Chul-Suk (born March 23, 1982) is a former South Korea football forward. 

He played for Busan I'Park in the K-League.

References

External links
 

1982 births
Living people
South Korean footballers
Busan IPark players
K League 1 players
Korea National League players

Association football forwards